Adele Williams (February 24, 1868 – 1952) was an American artist who was one of the earliest Impressionist painters in Virginia.

Biography
Adele Williams was born in Richmond, Virginia, the daughter of John H. Williams. Graduating high school at the age of 15, she went to New York in 1886 to study at the Woman's Art School of Cooper Union and the Art Students' League. She also studied at the Académie Julian in Paris, where she won the Prix Concours medal.

Williams worked in oil, watercolor, pastel, and mezzotint, painting landscapes, still lifes, and harbor and street scenes in an Impressionist style. She exhibited work at the Paris Salon during her stay in France, and after her return to the United States she showed at the American Watercolor Society, the Art Club of Philadelphia, and elsewhere. A number of her portraits are cataloged by the Catalogue of American Portraits at the National Portrait Gallery, including a 1902 self-portrait and a 1903 portrait of Ellen Axson Wilson, the first wife of President Woodrow Wilson. Her portrait of judge John W. Riely hangs in the Virginia Supreme Court, and her portrait of Commodore Matthew Fontaine Maury is owned by the University of Virginia.

References

1868 births
1952 deaths
American Impressionist painters
American women painters
Impressionist painters
Painters from Virginia
Artists from Richmond, Virginia
20th-century American painters
20th-century American women artists
Cooper Union alumni
Art Students League of New York alumni
Académie Julian alumni
Wikipedia articles incorporating text from A Woman of the Century